
Gmina Żarnów is a rural gmina (administrative district) in Opoczno County, Łódź Voivodeship, in central Poland.

Villages
Gmina Żarnów contains the villages and settlements of Adamów, Afryka, Antoniów, Bronów, Budków, Chełsty, Dąbie, Dłużniewice, Grębenice, Jasion, Kamieniec, Klew, Klew-Kolonia, Ławki, Łysa Góra, Malenie, Malków, Marcinków, Miedzna Murowana, Młynek, Myślibórz, Nadole, Niemojowice, Niemojowice-Kolonia, Nowa Góra, Odrowąż, Paszkowice, Pilichowice, Poręba, Ruszenice, Ruszenice-Kolonia, Siedlów, Sielec, Skórkowice, Skumros, Soczówki, Straszowa Wola, Tomaszów, Topolice, Trojanowice, Widuch, Wierzchowisko, Żarnów and Zdyszewice.

Neighbouring gminas
Gmina Żarnów is bordered by the gminas of Aleksandrów, Białaczów, Fałków, Końskie, Paradyż and Ruda Maleniecka.

References
Polish official population figures 2006

Zarnow
Opoczno County